The Balhae controversies involve disputes between China, Korea, Japan, and Russia, countries that have conducted studies on the historical state of Balhae (Bohai, Po-hai, Parhae). The Korean perspective generally considers Balhae to be the successor state of Goguryeo and part of the Northern and Southern States period of Korean history while Chinese scholars generally consider Balhae to be a state of the Mohe people, a Tungusic ethnic group, and subordinate to the Tang dynasty (618––907). In Russian historiography, Balhae is recognized as the first highly organized independent state formation of the Tungus-Manchurian peoples.

Background
Balhae (698-926) is a kingdom that has been studied and debated in East Asia since the early 20th century. Central to the issue of scholarship since the 1960s is whether or not Balhae belongs to Korean or Chinese national history. Arguments based on the identity and essential features of Balhae have been made by contemporary states to confirm or question territorial claims by present governments. Academic disputes over the identity of Goguryeo and Balhae are commonly linked to claims in international relations discourse on the legitimacy of the present Sino-Korean border.

The general positions of state actors involved in the Balhae dispute:

Koreas:
Balhae was a "Korean" state founded by the descendants of Goguryeo and that Balhae and Unified Silla constituted the "Northern and Southern Dynasties".

China:
Balhae was a local polity founded by the "Mohe nationality" subordinate to the Tang dynasty.

Soviet Union/Russia:
Balhae was created by a union of Mohe peoples who are the ancestors of tribal groups in Russian territory.

Empire of Japan:
Balhae was founded by a Sumo Mohe tribal leader with no connection to Goguryeo or Korea, and was independent from the Tang dynasty.

Balhae as Korean

Origin
Goryeo (918–1392) did not write an official history for Balhae, and some modern scholars argue that had they done so, Koreans might have had a stronger claim to Balhae's history and territory. This was in part because the writer of Korea's first historical record, the Samguk Sagi, was Gim Busik (1075-1151), who was a direct descendent of the ruling Silla dynasty. Silla was known to have held a hostile attitude towards Balhae, which might explain the exclusion of Balhae from the first complete compilation of Korean History. 

Although Goryeo did not compile an official history for Balhae, a great portion of the royalty and aristocracy fled to Goryeo including its Crown Prince Dae Gwang-hyeon. One of the Balhae refugees wrote a book titled the "Jodaegi," which detailed the history of Balhae. This work was known to have been cited by both Goryeo and Joseon scholars and works, but during the reign of Sejo of Joseon, the book was prohibited and copies of it confiscated, and it is now believed to have been lost.

The first inclusion of Balhae in Korean history was in the Jewang ungi, a historical book written in the form of rhyming poetry by Goryeo scholar and court official Lee Seung-hyu in 1287, during the late Goryeo dynasty. According to Myungkyung University Professor Lee Sooyoung, Lee was motivated to write the Jewangungi due to both the internal political turmoil of the Goryeo court as well as the Yuan dynasty's interference in Goryeo politics during Goryeo under Mongol rule. The Jewangungi is considered important as it is the first history book to record the history of Balhae as Korean history, and has been cited by both North and South Korean scholars.

Some scholars such as Bak Jiwon (1737–1805) denied the fact that the Han dynasty's territories extended south of the Yalu River, and criticized Gim Busik (1075–1151), the author of the Samguk Sagi, for excluding Balhae (Bohai in Chinese) in Manchuria from the history of Korea, arguing that the people of Balhae were "descendants" of Goguryeo. Yi Gyu-gyeong (b. 1788) argued that the exclusion of Balhae from Korean history was "a grave error" since "it occupied a vast area". In Joseon's later years, increasing numbers of Korean historians included Balhae in Korean history, despite acknowledging that the state's founders were the Mohe people and not considered to be "us." In the 18th century, there was a divide in opinions. Seongho Yi Ik (1681–1763) and An Jeongbok refused to consider Balhae part of Korean history while Sin Gyeongjun and Yu Deuk-gong (1749–1807) fully incorporated it. In Yu's Balhaego, an investigation of Balhae, he argued that Balhae should be included as part of Korean history and that doing so would justify territorial claims on Manchuria. A century later, Han Chiyun and Han Jinseo included Balhae as equal in Korean history to such uncontroversially Korean dynasties like Silla.

Korean historian Sin Chaeho (1880–1936) criticized the Samguk Sagi for excluding Balhae and Buyeo (Chinese: Fuyu, another state in Manchuria) from Korean history. Writing about Jiandao in the early 20th century, he bemoaned that for centuries, Korean people in their "hearts and eyes considered only the land south of the Yalu River as their home." He interpreted Balhae's defeat by the Khitan-led Liao dynasty (916–1125) as having caused "half of our ancestor Dangun's ancient lands... loss for over nine hundred years". Sin also criticized Gim Busik for excluding Balhae from his historical work and claiming that Silla had achieved the unification of Korea. Inspired by ideas of Social Darwinism, Sin wrote:

Modern scholars
North Korean scholars—and more recently some in the South—have recently tried to incorporate Balhae history as an integral part of Korean history by challenging the view of Unified Silla (668–935) as the unification of Korea. According to this narrative, Goryeo was the first unification of Korea, since Balhae still existed while occupying former Goguryeo territory north of the Korean peninsula. In the 1960s, the North Korean scholar Pak Se-yong advanced arguments that claimed Balhae as "a part of Korean history." Central to the argument was Balhae's place as "a state founded by people of Koguryŏ" and its territory as "composed of most of the"former territory of Koguryŏ and an expansive, newly acquired portion." Pak made broader claims on the continuity of Balhae with modern Korea, contending that "bloodline and culture are an important component of the bloodlines and cultural traditions of the Korean race."

In South Korea, Chu Yŏnghŏn advocated a Korean identity for Balhae based on findings of joint Chinese-North Korean archaeological excavations in the 1960s. These efforts led to the incorporation of Balhae into Korean history as part of the "Northern and Southern Dynasties" based on instances in which the Silla court referred to Balhae as the "northern court." Acceptance of this new narrative was not immediate. In 1981 a South Korean scholar called the Northern-Southern Dynasties an "interesting new interpretation" and as late as 1990 there was still no consensus. However, by now the Northern-Southern Dynasties paradigm is widely accepted in South Korean academia. According to Kim Eun Gug, the adoption of this position was necessary to counter Chinese claims on Goguryeo and Balhae as part of Chinese history as well as to provide a model for North and South Korea's unification. Kim openly declared that "We have a national responsibility to develop a response to China’s Northeast Project and its claims that Koguryŏ and Parhae belong to Chinese history."

Some Japanese scholarship from the mid-1930s to the early postwar period also supported placing Balhae within Korean history. This position was advanced mostly prominently by Mikami Tsugio and became very popular after Japan severed diplomatic ties with the People's Republic of China in 1949. In the 1980s, Japanese scholars scrutinized new archaeological evidence from China in hopes of clarifying Balhae's ethnic identity. However, since then the majority of Japanese scholars have moved away from seeking a singular ethnic paradigm for Balhae and instead focus on local government mechanisms and their relationship with central authority. According to Park Jin Suk, Japan no longer has any territorial interests in Balhae and its scholars offer a more objective position.

Balhae as Chinese

Jurchens and Manchus
Historically, the Jurchens (later renamed the Manchus), believed they shared ancestry with the Mohe. According to the History of Jin, the history of the Jurchen-led Jin dynasty (1115–1234), the Jin founder Emperor Taizu of Jin once sent ambassadors to Bohai people living in the Liao dynasty (916–1125) to convince them to rebel against the Liao. He claimed that "the Jurchens and Bohai were originally of the same family" (女直渤海本同一家) and that they were "actually one family, because in origin they were consisted of seven Wuji tribes."

Archaeological materials from the Anan'evskoe site show material evidence of ancestral relations between the Jurchens and Bohai people. Several South Korean scholars believe that after Bohai's destruction in 926, Bohai's population was divided into two groups. Influential Bohai families were sent to the inner part of the Liao dynasty and were referred to as Bohai people while those who remained under indirect management were called Jurchen. Han Ciu-cheol argues that Jurchens could be considered part of Korean history. Soviet and Russian scholars agree there were hereditary relationships between Mohe and Jurchen and that the Bohai population certainly contributed culturally to the ethnogenesis of the Jurchen. However some differences remain. The Balhae refugee population was received well in Goryeo while they had a combative relationship with the Jurchens. Goryeo once massacred the ambassador and leaders of a Jurchen delegation during peace talks. They sent an official complaint about the Jurchens to the Song dynasty, calling them greedy liars and other insulting names. The Jurchens described Goryeo people as enemies and often came into military conflict with them. The Jurchen and Bohai people also differed in their level of technological and societal sophistication. Chinese sources describe the Jurchens as lacking law, governors, kings, or dignitaries. Prior to the reign of Wanyan Wugunai (1021–1074), in the early 11th century, the Jurchens could not produce iron armor and had to trade for it from other tribes.

In 1778, the Qianlong Emperor of the Qing dynasty reviewed various history books and commissioned a new comprehensive history of the Manchus, the Researches on Manchu Origins. Part of this endeavor was to create a new imperial history of Manchus that was glorious in its own right and not a frontier imitation of Chinese civilization. This new history placed their Jin ancestors, the Jin imperial clan, among the population of the Mohe, who lived in the Changbai Mountains and along the Amur. Qianlong repeatedly made references to the Bohai as the origin of various organizational features such as the use of "the five-capitals, a writing system, and a leadership hierarchy that he believed was evident in early Qing history and still in use among Northeastern peoples."

Finnish linguist Juha Janhunen argues that it is possible Goguryeo language could have been an Amuric language related to today's Nivkh language isolate.

People's Republic of China
Since 1949, the People's Republic of China has depicted the country as a multi-ethnic state and endeavored to create unity among the country's various minorities to strengthen the nation as a unified construct. According to this narrative, Chinese scholarship has generally characterized Bohai as a "local polity of a minority nationality" subordinate to Tang rule and that the history of Bohai belongs to China. Only in the 1980s did study of Bohai become a major enterprise in China. In the mid-2000s Bohai studies received a new impetus from the Northeast Project. The project was seen by South Korean scholars as a concerted political effort to "contest the role of Koguryŏ and Parhae" as part of Korean history. There was concern that China would seek recognition from UNESCO. Park Jin Suk argues that "the Chinese position has been solidified" by the Northeast Project and now presents a united front against other historical interpretations. Although a standard Chinese position never actually developed and contradictions within Chinese scholars remain, there are no Chinese authors advocating Bohai as Korean.

Chinese research was described as focusing "solely on the relationship between Parhae and Tang, leading to the conclusion that Parhae was only a local government dependent in every respect on Tang." Such an assessment is no longer entirely true as Chinese scholarship now pays more attention to Bohai's relationship with other polities. A recent Chinese introduction to the topic categorized Bohai's diplomatic exchanges with the Tang as a "relationship between cultures" while other diplomatic actions were "foreign relations". According to Lei Yijie, Bohai was a "local ethnic polity" ruled by the Tang. Kaneko Shūichi notes that the Tang treated Bohai and Silla the same. Formally they were "prefectures under loose rule" (jimizhou). In 713, the Tang court granted Da Zuorong the post of Commander-in-Chief (dudu) of Huhan Prefecture, the Tang name for Bohai's capital. In practice it is hard for Chinese dynasties to claim any state as independent under the "tribute model." This problem is exhibited by states such as Silla, Goryeo, and Joseon, all of which had less political autonomy than Bohai but are not claimed as Chinese. Epigraphic evidence shows that the rulers of Bohai considered themselves emperors and empresses. In communications between Bohai and the Japanese court, Bohai's ruler referred to himself as "Grandson of Heaven" and portrayed the relationship between himself and the ruler of Japan as uncle to nephew. Sakayori Masashi believes this was meant to express his superiority in a "Sinocentric worldview" centered on Bohai and to claim sovereignty over Silla and the Mohe tribes.

An earlier, opposing view comes from Chinese Prime Minister Zhou Enlai, who said in 1963 that Korean people have lived in the northeastern region of China since ancient times and excavated relics prove that Bohai is a branch of ancient Korea. The former Chinese premier's remarks have been made public through a document entitled “Premier Zhou Enlai's Dialogue on Sino-Korean Relations.“

Historical sites
China is accused of limiting Korean archaeologists access to historical sites located within Liaoning and Jilin. Starting from 1994, increasing numbers of South Korean tourists began to visit Goguryeo archaeological sites in China and often engaged in nationalistic displays. China perceived this as a threat and restricted foreign access to Goguryeo sites. This perception was aggravated by a series of tomb robberies and vandalism at several of these archaeological sites between 1995 and 2000. South Korean archeologist Song Ki-ho, a noted professor at Seoul National University who has published several papers criticizing the Chinese government's interpretation of Bohai 's history, made several visits to China in the 1990s, 2000, 2003, and 2004, examining several historical sites and museums. However, he found himself restricted by limitations on note-taking and photography and was even ejected from several sites by museum employees.

Balhae as Manchurian
The placement of Balhae within Manchurian history was advanced by Japanese scholarship as their political and military interests grew after the First Sino-Japanese War in 1895. The Manchurian framework emphasized the distinctiveness of Balhae culture compared to Tang China, Goguryeo, and Silla. The Japanese archaeologist Komai Kazuchika led the excavation of Balhae's Supreme Capital in 1933–1934. In his draft of a "Cultural History of Manchuria," the first ruler of Balhae was described as "a ruler of the Sumo Mohe" with no connection to Korea or Goguryeo and independent of the Tang dynasty.

Russian position 

In traditional Russian historiography, this state is recognized as the first highly organized independent state formation of the Tungus-Manchurian peoples. Still other Russian scholars argue that they cannot determine the ethnic composition of Bohai with great precision as no materials has been found that can conclusively confirm the opinion of either the Chinese or the Korean side. Shavkunov has proposed that ancient Ainu-speaking and Nivh-speaking tribes as well as Turkic-speaking people may also have been part of the Bohai population in addition to the traditionally recognized inhabitants of Bohai (Koguryo and Mohe). Shavkunov refers to sources that indicate that the second sovereign of Bohai, Dae Mu-ye, had the title of governor-general of the Nine Uighur tribes and was governor-general of Yan Jan (Modern day northeastern Mongolia) in which the Uighur resided. He concluded that many Uighur fled to Bohai after the Uighur Khaganate was destroyed by the Yenisei Kyrgyz suggesting that the arrival of the Uighurs caused the Bohai government additional problems due to difficulties in adapting to Bohai society and causing social unrest.

On the territory of Russia, over 130 years, 18 small objects (detached farm, a watchtower, a smithy far outside village, etc.), 19 villages and 7 cities of this state have been studied.  Also in Russian academic science there is other data on the borders of this state than in Korea and China.

Bohai studies were not left outside the political driven polemics during the era of the Sino-Soviet split. Soviet scholars  wrote extensively about the war between the Tang Empire and the state of Bohai, paying great attention to the victories of the Bohai forces and emphasizing the independence of the state, while at the same time trying to downplay the results of the war, which made Bohai to re-confirm its inferior position vis-a-vis the Tang Empire in the tributary system.

Russian Archeologists found in the area an Abbasid drachma from Central Asia which may indicate an economy in which foreign currency may have been used. The archeologists laid stress on the argument that the absence of an independently developed coinage is not sufficient evidence to deny that the Bohai state existed as an independent state.

Alexander L'vovich Ivliev stresses that Bohai students are mentioned in Chinese sources (e.g. New Book of Tang) to have sat for the bingongke (賓貢科) exam indicating that for the Tang officials the students were subjects of other states as opposed to subjects of the Tang realm.

Subjects of contention

Ethnicity
The ethnicity of Balhae's population is the most widely debated topic in the debate over its historical identity. The generally held position by most scholars is that Balhae society was separated into two ethnic components: descendants of Goguryeo and Mohe tribal groups. However within this paradigm exists a number of different views on the relationship of the two groups.

Korean scholarship and history textbooks teach that "the ruling class of Parhae were persons of Koguryŏ origins and that the people over whom they ruled were the Malgal, a people whose ethnic origins were different from Koguryŏ." This Korean framework portrays Balhae as a country, state, and government founded and dominated by Goguryeo people, an ethnic group equivalent to modern Koreans. The ethnic identity of the rulers is the overriding identity marker of Balhae, placing it within Korean history. Chŏn Hoch’ŏn characterizes Balhae and the peninsular Korean state of Silla as possessing "the same ethnicity." Song Ki-ho and No T'aedon argue that the Mohe were Tungusic people who had been assimilated into Goguryeo and Balhae, thereby making Mohe part of Korean history. A few scholars in Korea such as Han Ciu-cheol argue that there was no difference between the Goguryeo and Mohe population and that they were the same ethnicity. Mohe was used as a pejorative term for the lower class. In the same vein, Jang Guk-jong argues that Mohe tribes in Balhae were not Mohe but part of Goguryeo's provincial population.

In China, the Mohe are generally considered the "main ethnicity" while Goguryeo descendants occupy a secondary minority position. Based on the New Book of Tang, Chinese scholars argue that Balhae's founders were from the Sumo Mohe tribe centered on the Songhua River.

In 1915, Tsuda Sōkichi noted that Tang sources describe the Baishan Mohe as more closely allied to Goguryeo while the Sumo were actually in conflict with Goguryeo. Li Jiancai argues that based on this finding, the founder of Balhae, Dae Joyeong or Da Zuorong, was more likely to have been from the Baishan tribe. This position has been adopted by a number of Chinese scholars but remains marginal. Another marginal position presented by Sun Jinji argues that Balhae was not just Mohe but that diverse groups merged to form a Balhae ethnicity. This is directly opposed by Yun Jae-Woon, who points out separate activities by Mohe and Jurchen groups after the fall of Balhae which demonstrate that they had not been absorbed into Balhae. However Jesse D. Sloane notes that this does not mean a new ethnicity did not form as well while not everyone were absorbed into it.

Russian scholars argue that the ethnic composition of Balhae cannot be determined with great precision because no materials exist that can confirm either the Chinese or Korean claims. Some Russian scholars claim Balhae as part of Manchurian history while others believe Balhae was neither a Korean state or Chinese province and there is no direct link between Balhae and either modern China or Korea. E. V. Shakunov believes that Balhae's population also consisted of elements from Central Asia such as Sogdians and Tocharians. Many Uyghurs fled to Balhae after the destruction of the Uyghur Khaganate in 840 but they failed to adapt to Balhae society and caused social unrest.

Population change
Besides the territorial aspirations of both Korean nationalists and those of Joseon rulers during the mid-late period of the Joseon dynasty, Korean claims to Balhae also rest on ethnicity as well as East Asian concepts of state succession. When Balhae was destroyed by the Liao dynasty, a great portion of the Balhae royalty and aristocracy fled to Goryeo, including Dae Gwang-hyeon, the last crown prince. They were granted land and the crown prince was given the family name Wang (왕, 王), the royal family name of the Goryeo dynasty, and included in the royal household by Wang Geon, who was crowned as Taejo of Goryeo. Koreans believe Goryeo thus unified the two successor nations of Goguryeo. Some other members of the Balhae royalty took the surname Tae (태, 太).  According to the Goryeosa jeolyo, the Balhae refugees who accompanied the crown prince numbered in the tens of thousands of households. As descendants of Goguryeo, the Balhae people and the Goryeo dynasts were related. Taejo of Goryeo felt a strong familial kinship with Balhae, calling it his "relative country" and "married country", and protected the Balhae refugees. This was in stark contrast to Later Silla, which had endured a hostile relationship with Balhae.

Crossley believes that according to Goryeo records, Balhae refugees only arrived in groups of a few hundred to a few thousand. She suggests that the total number could not be more than 100,000, while millions remained in Liao-controlled territories. According to Crossley, it's also unclear whether they stayed, went back to Balhae, or moved on elsewhere like China or Japan. According to Kim, between the 10th and 11th centuries, 30,000 Balhae families (more than 100,000 people) immigrated to Goryeo, 94,000 (470,000 inhabitants) local families were deported by the Liao, and only 20,000 Balhae families lived in the former territories of Balhae, a significantly smaller figure than those that immigrated to Goryeo. Korean historians generally estimate that approximately 100,000 to 200,000 fled from Balhae to Goryeo. Historian Professor Park Jong-gi estimated that 120,600 people fled from Balhae to Goryeo, and by themselves comprised approximately 6.3% of early Goryeo's roughly 2 million inhabitants.

Exodus en masse on part from the Balhae refugees would continue on at least until the early 12th century during the reign of King Yejong, according to Korean scholars. Due to this constant massive influx of Balhae refugees, the Goguryeo population is speculated to have become dominant in proportion compared to their Silla and Baekje counterparts that have experienced devastating war and political strife since the advent of the Later Three Kingdoms. Later Baekje fared only little better than Later Silla before its fall in 936. Meanwhile, of the three capitals of Goryeo, two were Kaesong and Pyeongyang which were initially populated by Goguryeoic settlers from the Paeseo Region (패서, 浿西) and Balhae.

Textual sources

Chinese
While the study of Balhae draws on a wide range of textual sources, most investigations of its ethnicity start from the two official histories of the Tang dynasty. Efforts have been made to seek evidence in other texts but works by Balhae authors are extremely scarce.

According to the Old Book of Tang, the founder of Balhae, Da Zuorong or Dae Joyeong, was a Mohe but adds that he was gaoli biezhong (高麗別種). Literally speaking, biezhong means "separate kind." The term gaoli biezhong has been interpreted in different ways. Korean historians believe it means "a branch of the Goguryeo people" while Japanese and Chinese researchers believe it means "distinct from Goguryeo". Lei Yijie and Yao Yucheng argue that biezhong does not indicate ethnicity at all and was used in Chinese official sources in situations where different groups with similar culture occupied the same area. Kaizaburo Hino suggests that Da Zuorong or Dae Joyeoung was a member of the Mohe that were incorporated into Goguryeo populace, as the need to explicitly mention gaoli biezhong would have otherwise been unnecessary. 

According to Han Ciu-cheol, the Old Book states that the customs of Balhae such as coming of age ceremonies, marriages, funerals and memorial rites, were the same as Goguryeo, which Korean historians often cite to support their arguments. According to Kim Eun Gug, the Old Book indicates that the Tang court bestowed Mu of Balhae the title of “King of Kyeru Commandery," which is significant because Kyeru (Gyeru) was the name that was used to denote old Goguryeo territory. Kim Eun Gug believe this indicates that the Tang recognized Balhae as Goguryeo's successor.

The New Book of Tang, compiled in the 11th century, refers to Dae Joyeong and his state as Sumo Mohe affiliated with Goguryeo. The New Book states that "Parhae was originally the Mohe [tribes] who had submitted to Koguryŏ; the clan surname [of its rulers] was Da." Chinese scholars have argued that Balhae's founder was a member of the Sumo Mohe and Balhae's royalty were Mohe rather than Goguryeo based on this account. Yun challenged this by arguing that though he may have been Mohe, they "would have already undergone a substantial process of Koguryŏ-ization" while providing military service to Goguryeo over two generations. Han Ciu-cheol notes that Chinese historians often cite the New Book in their arguments, whereas Korean historians often cite the Old Book due to their conflicting viewpoints on the ethnicity of Balhae's founder as well as the nature of Balhae's society.

According to Sloane, Tang sources divided Balhae's population into two categories, Goguryeo and Mohe. The royalty and upper class were composed of Goguryeo remnants while the majority of Balhae's population were Mohe.

Korean
According to Choe Chiwon (b. 857), who was from Silla, the people of Balhae were Mohe. In the conflict between the joint Tang-Silla forces against Balhae, Silla described Balhae as "rebellious barbarians." Sillan aristocracy tended to view the Balhae population as consisting of solely Mohe people, but this could be due to the antagonistic relations between the two states causing the Sillan nobility to ignore Goguryeo elements of Balhae ethnic composition.

The Samguk sagi, written in the 12th century by Gim Busik, did not consider Balhae a Korean state. The Samguk yusa, a 13th-century collection of Korean history and legends, describes Dae as a Sumo Mohe leader. However, it gives another account of Dae being a former Goguryeo general, citing a now-lost Sillan record. Alexander Kim considers this unlikely since Goguryeo fell in 668 while Dae died in 719, and young men could not receive the rank of general.

Japanese
The Ruijū Kokushi, a 9th-century Japanese text, says that when Balhae was founded, it spanned 2,000 li and was filled with villages, each of which were Mohe tribes.

According to Pak Se-yong, the "natives" in the passage refer to people of Goguryeo, and therefore all officials in the local and central government were Koguryŏ aristocrats. This has been challenged by Han Ciu-cheol, who argues that the term for "native" (J. dojin 土人) should be read as "literati" (J. shijin 士人) instead. The resulting translation would therefore be: "Everywhere there were villages and those villages were all Malgal settlements. There are many Malgal among the commoners but there are few literati." Han notes that in some editions of the Ruijū Kokushi, dojin was replaced with shijin instead. However Han's position is opposed by Fu Langyun, who argues that dojin does not refer to either Mohe or Goguryeo people but rather a separate group of native inhabitants while Yang Jun argues that dojin refers to the Sumo Mohe, who were the natives and referred to themselves as such.

Japanese diplomatic communications with Balhae recognized it as a "state of Go[gu]ryeo." In a diplomatic mission to Japan in 727 or 728, the Balhae envoy said that Balhae has "recovered the lost land of Goguryeo and inherited the old traditions of Buyeo." Mun of Balhae referred to himself as "King of Goryeo" but Reisa Shimoda suggests that this was not to restore the old name, as noted in the Dai Nihonshi, but as a means of gaining Japan's favor by invoking Goryeo. Examples of Balhae envoys being referred to as Goryeo envoys and Balhae kings as the king of Goryeo are found extensively in the Nara Period but have not been found during the later Heian Period. According to Japanese historian Shiratori Kurakichi, 26 of the 85 emissaries dispatched to Japan by Parhae bore the typical Goguryeo surname of Ko (Go), which is still commonly used in Korea, which indicated a substantial Goguryeo presence in Balhae culture. Some Korean historians believe that a record in the Shoku Nihongi implies that the Balhae and Silla language were mutually intelligible: a student sent from Silla to Japan for Japanese language interpreter training assisted a diplomatic envoy from Balhae in communicating with the audience of a Japanese court.

Archaeology

Burials
Chinese scholars have argued that the use of single-chambered brick tombs shows Tang influence. These single-chamber brick tombs appear later in Balhae history and appear less frequently. It was probably not due to a lack of other material that brick was used as stone was widely used around the capital sites. In the early 1980s, Nishikawa Hiroshi argued that early Balhae tombs resembled the Balhae practice of joint burial and reburial. Earthen pit tombs have also been interpreted as Mohe practice by Japanese and Chinese scholarship. Yun Jae-Woon argues that vertical-slit pits were used by non-elites universally and that earth tombs were more common in early Balhae but many features found in Balhae tombs are influenced by Goguryeo such as above ground structures, roof tiles, and the use of stone. According to Han Ciu-cheol, Balhae's ruling class used stone lined tombs, stone chambers and stone coffins which had been used by Goguryeo's ruling class.

Ceramics
Balhae's ceramic vessels in China have been divided into three stylistic types: Mohe, Goguryeo, and Tang. Early Balhae vessels were mainly categorized as of the Mohe type and used as evidence Balhae was founded by Mohe. Chinese archaeologists argue that the geographic distribution of Balhae's ceramics match that of the "wide-mouthed, deep-bellied jars of coarse black-brown material" from proceeding centuries in the same area. Chinese archaeologists refer to the previous culture as "Tongren Culture" while texts refer to the inhabitants of the area as "Mohe" and "Wuji" (K. Mulgil, J. Mukkitsu). Later Balhae pottery show technical improvement and the introduction of three-color glazes.

Wei Cuncheng argues that "deep-bellied cylindrical jars and bowls" were prevalent from before the 8th century until the 10th or 11th centuries, especially in small burials and outside the capitals. He argues that these are indicative of the Sumo Mohe tribe and demonstrate that the majority of Balhae's population, particularly during its founding, was culturally, and ethnically Mohe. Yun Jae-Woon argues that similar jars have been found at Goguryeo sites but it is unclear if these are of the same type and could date later than the jars Wei refers to. Yun also argues that the jars do not indicate ethnic difference and "should be seen as reflecting social and cultural differences between elites and non-elites and between the center and the provinces."

City planning
Lee Byeong Gun argues that the pairing of flat riverside settlements with hilltop redoubts distinguishes Balhae settlements from Tang Chinese urban planning. To Lee, mountain sites represent the indigenous culture of Goguryeo, supporting the continuity and succession from Goguryeo to Balhae. Chinese scholarship does not portray Tang and Balhae styles as identical but rather emphasizes influences on Balhae. Round eave-end roof tiles show Goguryeo influence while ceramic ornamentation show Tang influence. The patterns of Balhae style eave-end roof tiles have been used in China for reconstruction of a Tang dynasty site in Shanxi. Korean scholars argue that the existence of heated platforms in some building sites in the Balhae capital indicate Balhae succession from Goguryeo. Chinese scholars point to the existence of pit dwellings as examples of Mohe culture. No consensus has been reached yet on the cultural origin of the Lingguang Pagoda located in Changbai County, the only surviving above ground example of Balhae architecture.

Notes

References

Bibliography

 
 
 
 * 

Balhae
1st millennium in Korea
1st millennium in China
Historiography of China